Sue Dorrington (born 10 June 1958) is a former English rugby union player and pioneer of the women's game, in England and internationally.

Biography 
Dorrington was born and raised in Minnesota, USA. She started playing rugby in the early eighties and moved to London in 1983 for more competitive rugby. She played for Richmond Women and represented both Great Britain, and England in test matches.

Dorrington and three of her Richmond teammates — Deborah Griffin, Alice Cooper, and Mary Forsyth, organized the first Women's Rugby World Cup in Wales in 1991. She had to balance her role on the Women’s Rugby World Cup Organising Committee and also as England’s starting hooker at the World Cup. She missed the official opening ceremony as she had to take care of Griffin’s daughter, and then line up at hooker for England the following day.

Dorrington later captained England against Scotland at the 1994 World Cup. She did not get to play in the final when England beat defending champions the United States 38–23. She played her last test for England in 1997. She continued to play for Richmond and is the only player to represent Richmond for over three decades.

Dorrington was also Richmond’s first-ever female vice-president.

World Rugby Hall of Fame 
Dorrington, Griffin, Cooper, and Forsyth were inducted into the World Rugby Hall of Fame in a special ceremony during the 2021 Rugby World Cup semi-finals at Eden Park on 5 November 2022.

References 

Living people
1958 births
English female rugby union players
England women's international rugby union players